Ayapel Airport  is an airport located in Ayapel, Colombia.

References

Airports in Colombia
Buildings and structures in Córdoba Department